Khalisani Mahavidyalaya is one of the oldest college in Chandannagar,  in the Hooghly district, West Bengal, India. It offers undergraduate courses in arts, commerce and sciences.

History
The institution was established on 1 September 1970 to cater to the educational and cultural needs for the people of a locality stretching to the rural neighborhood in the western fringe of the town of Chandannagar. The establishment was possible because of the initiative taken by some pious and philanthropic persons. In the initial years of the journey the college achieved the recognition of the UGC under 2F and 12B, and got the affiliation under the University of Burdwan. The early years witnessed the excellence of the College in National Service Scheme and in the establishment of Hooghly District Blood Donors Society. From the last two decades of the last century Khalisani Mahavidyalaya have expanded their horizon and introduced various subjects in both Honors and General courses in B.A., B.Com. and B.Sc. streams. The College is now providing 12 Honors courses, apart from four courses in the general stream to almost 1000 students for each session, who come from a large feeder zone comprising the urban settlements like Chandannagar, Chinsurah, Bandel, and the rural areas of Singur. Majority of the students passed from the institutions are at present well established citizens in various facets of professions. It is affiliated to University of Burdwan.

Departments

Science

Chemistry
Physics
Mathematics
Botany
Zoology

Arts and Commerce

Bengali
English
Sanskrit
History
Geography
Political Science
Philosophy
Economics
Education
Commerce

Library
The motto of Khalisani Mahavidyalaya library is "Save the time of the reader". It is based on one of the five laws of library as established by Dr. S. R. Ranganathan, the father of Library Science in India. At present the library consists of over 25,000 physical volumes. The library maintains institutional memberships of British Council Libraries, National Institute of Science Communication and Information Resources (NISCAIR). It also provides its readers with access to JSTOR and NLIST e-resources from UGC INFLIBNET.

The Library OPAC (Online public access catalog) is accessible at http://khalisani-opac.l2c2.co.in

Accreditation
In 2016 Khalisani Mahavidyalaya has been Re-accredited and awarded B++ grade with merit point 2.77 out of 4.0 (CGPA) by the National Assessment and Accreditation Council (NAAC). Recently, the college has achieved Challenge Level Funding of RUSA securing 7th position among the colleges of West Bengal and 99th position among the colleges of India. The college is also recognized by the University Grants Commission (UGC).

See also

References

External links
Khalisani Mahavidyalaya

Universities and colleges in Hooghly district
Colleges affiliated to University of Burdwan
Chandannagar
Educational institutions established in 1970
1970 establishments in West Bengal